Akimov (masculine) and Akimova (feminine) is a Russian surname. It is shared by the following people:

 Alexander Ivanovich Akimov (1895–1965), Soviet general
 Aleksandr Akimov (1953–1986), the shift supervisor at the Chernobyl Nuclear Power Plant
 Aleksandra Akimova (5 May 1922–29 December 2012), navigator during World War II and Hero of the Russian Federation
 Andrey Akimov (b. 1953), a Russian businessman
 Iryna Akimova (b. 1960), a Ukrainian politician
 Ivan Akimov (1754–1814), a Russian Neoclassical painter
 Maxim Akimov (b. 1970), a Russian politician
 Nikolay Akimov (1901–1968), a Russian theater director
 Olga Akimova (b. 1983), an Uzbekistani ice dancer

References
 

 

Russian-language surnames